Also Sprach Zarathustra is an album by NSK industrial group Laibach originally produced for a theatrical production of Thus Spoke Zarathustra, based on Friedrich Nietzsche’s philosophical novel of the same name, by director Matjaz Berger, which premiered in March 2016. The single "Vor Sonnen-Aufgang" was released from the album.

Track listing
Vor Sonnen-Untergang	
Ein Untergang	
Die Unschuld I	
Ein Verkündiger	
Von Gipfel Zu Gipfel	
Das Glück	
Das Nachtlied I	
Das Nachtlied II	
Die Unschuld II	
Als Geist	
Vor Sonnen-Aufgang	
Von Den Drei Verwandlungen

Critical reception

The album was well received by critics. On the website of the collected reviews, Metacritic has an 81 ratings rating of 100 based on 9 reviews, which means "general recognition". For Mladino , Veljko Njegovan rated the album with 5 stars and wrote: "[...] Laibach undoubtedly proves that on the symbolic level" has broken "many iron curtains, which lasts since the beginning of the eighties."

On Radio Študent , the album was ranked 8th, while on 24ur.com , it was ranked 2nd in the best Slovenian albums of the year.

References

Laibach (band) albums
2017 albums
Mute Records albums
Covers albums